The Lost Aviator is a feature documentary written and directed by Andrew Lancaster starring Ewen Leslie as the voice of Bill Lancaster and Yael Stone as the voice of Chubbie Miller. The film was premiered at the 58th  BFI London Film Festival, and was distributed theatrically by Transmission Films in Australia.

Synopsis
Director Andrew Lancaster opens up a 1932 case about his uncle Bill Lancaster, an aviator who went on trial for murder in Miami. In the process he unravels more information about the illustrious life of Bill, which spans multiple continents.

Cast
 Bill Lancaster voiced by Ewen Leslie
 Chubbie Miller voiced by Yael Stone
 Haden Clarke played by Kipan Rothbury
 Hawthorne voiced by Torquil Neilson
 Carson voiced by Troy Planet

Production
The Lost Aviator was produced by Noni Couell and Andrew Lancaster in Association with Porchlight Films and Photoplay Films. It was shot over 4 years in Australia, England, USA, France.

Reception
The Lost Aviator had its world premiere at 58th BFI London Film Festival in October 2014 and went on to have its US Premiere at 32nd Miami International Film Festival to sold out screenings. The Australian Premiere was at the 62nd Sydney International Film Festival where it picked up a special jury mention for Best Documentary.
Guy Lodge of Variety wrote "Family history merges with tabloid legend in Andrew Lancaster's engrossing account of a vintage aviation-world scandal" and "the director probes his relatives’ memories with delicacy and good humor." Hollywood Reporter critic Johnathan Holland wrote the Lost Aviator is "a great globe spanning story", "intriguing and thought provoking."

References

External links

Australian documentary films
2014 documentary films
2014 films
2010s English-language films